Carole Louise Quinton (born 11 July 1936) is a female former English track and field athlete, who won silver medals at the 1958 British Empire and Commonwealth Games, 1958 European Athletics Championships and 1960 Summer Olympics.

Athletics career
Quinton competed in the sprint and 80 metres hurdles events. She competed for Great Britain at the 1956 Summer Olympics. Despite not being in the initial British squad, she was selected to replace Pam Elliot, who withdrew as she was pregnant. She represented England and won a silver medal in the 80 metres hurdles at the 1958 British Empire and Commonwealth Games in Cardiff, Wales. In the final, Quinton and winner Norma Thrower finished in a wind assisted 10.7 seconds in the final, faster than the previous Games record, though due to the wind assistance, it was not classified as a Games record time. At the time of her British Commonwealth and Empire Games medal, Quinton was the reigning British national champion in the 80 metres event. In the same year, she was in the British team that came second in the 4 × 100 metres relay event at the 1958 European Athletics Championships. In 1959, she competed in a Great Britain vs West Germany athletics meeting in White City, London. She came second in the 80 metres hurdles event.

In 1960, she set the British national record time for the 80 metres hurdles twice. She ran a record time of 11.0 seconds in July 1960, and later in the month, she ran a new record time of 10.9 seconds. At the 1960 Summer Olympics in Rome, Italy, Quinton won the silver medal in the 80 m hurdles. She also competed in the 4 × 100 metres relay alongside Dorothy Hyman, Jenny Smart and Mary Rand. They did not finish in the final of the event.

Personal life
Quinton was born in Rugby, Warwickshire. She worked as a shorthand typist. In 1961, she married water polo player David Barr in Hove.

References

1936 births
Living people
British female hurdlers
English female sprinters
English female hurdlers
British female sprinters
Olympic athletes of Great Britain
Olympic silver medallists for Great Britain
Sportspeople from Rugby, Warwickshire
Athletes (track and field) at the 1956 Summer Olympics
Athletes (track and field) at the 1960 Summer Olympics
Commonwealth Games medallists in athletics
Commonwealth Games silver medallists for England
Athletes (track and field) at the 1958 British Empire and Commonwealth Games
European Athletics Championships medalists
Medalists at the 1960 Summer Olympics
Olympic silver medalists in athletics (track and field)
Medallists at the 1958 British Empire and Commonwealth Games